61 MPs chose to not seek reelection at the 2015 Canadian federal election, meaning they were Members of Parliament (MPs) in the 41st Parliament of Canada, but chose not to stand for election to the 42nd Parliament of Canada (in some cases after being deselected by their parties).

Retired from office

Lost Nomination

Seats vacant at dissolution

Notes

References